The Hillsborough Reservoir is the major source of drinking water for the island of Tobago.  Located 36.5 metres (100 ft) above sea level, the reservoir is managed by Water and Sewerage Authority of Trinidad and Tobago.  It has a capacity of about 1 million m3 (225 million gallons).

Construction began in 1944 and the facility was commissioned in 1952 by Governor Sir Hubert Rance.

See also
 List of reservoirs and dams in Trinidad and Tobago

References

Reservoirs in Trinidad and Tobago